Pascale Hutton (born June 14, 1979) is a Canadian actress. Known for roles such as FBI special agent Abby Corrigan on science fiction-fantasy series Sanctuary, Krista Ivarson on rural airline drama Arctic Air, and as Rosemary LeVeaux Coulter on drama series When Calls the Heart.

Biography
Hutton was born in Creston, British Columbia. She attended the conservatory acting program at the University of Alberta in Edmonton.

Filmography

Film

Television

Online

Awards and nominations

References

External links 
 
 

1979 births
Living people
Canadian television actresses
Canadian film actresses
21st-century Canadian actresses
Actresses from British Columbia
Canadian people of French descent
People from the Regional District of Central Kootenay